John Peyton Cooke (born March 7, 1967) is an American novelist. He is most notable as a short story writer known for thrillers, often with gay male protagonists and including themes of male homosexuality and psychological suspense.

Reviews 
His novel Torsos, a fictionalized account of the Cleveland Torso Murderer, was a finalist for the Lambda Literary Award for Best Gay Men’s Mystery for 1993, and was noted by Marilyn Stasio in The New York Times Book Review for its atmospheric depiction of Cleveland, Ohio, during the Great Depression. His short story "After You’ve Gone" was selected for The Best American Mystery Stories 2003, edited by Michael Connelly and Otto Penzler.

Cooke's 1991 gay vampire novel Out for Blood, originally published by Avon Books, was reprinted in 2019 by Valancourt Books (also issued in audiobook) and Cooke was interviewed about his novel by the audiobook's narrator Sean C. Duregger on his podcast Audiobooks from Hell.

Awards and honors 
 1994 finalist for Best Gay Men's Mystery, 6th Lambda Literary Awards
 2003 The Best American Mystery Stories 2003

Publications

Books
 The Lake (1989), Avon Books, New York 
 Out for Blood (1991), Avon Books, New York 
 Torso (1993), Headline Books, London .
 Torsos (1994), The Mysterious Press/Warner Books, New York 
 Torsos (1994), translated into Spanish by María del Mar Moya, Planeta, Barcelona 
 The Chimney Sweeper (1994), Headline Books, London 
 The Chimney Sweeper (1995), The Mysterious Press/Warner Books, New York 
 Haven (1996), The Mysterious Press/Warner Books, New York 
 The Rape of Ganymede (2008), Éditions Cuir Noir, Toronto 
 The Fall of Lucifer (2008), Éditions Cuir Noir, Toronto 
 After You’ve Gone and Other Outré Tales (2011), Éditions Cuir Noir, London 
 Out for Blood (2019), Valancourt Books, Richmond, Virginia

Short fiction
”The Cat’s Meow”, in Eldritch Tales, No. 12, 1986.
”Sweet Chariot” (with Catherine Cooke), Space and Time, No. 72, Summer 1987.
”A Doll’s Tale”, in Weird Tales, No. 295, Winter 1989/90.
”The Strawberry Man”, in Embracing the Dark, edited by Eric Garber, Alyson Books, Boston, 1991. 
”The Naked Tooth”, in Christopher Street, No. 185, August 17, 1992.
”Spoiled Rotten”, in Eldritch Tales, No. 28, 1993.
”Telling Tales”, in The Mystery Zone, 1995.
”The Penitent”, in Dark Love, edited by Nancy A. Collins, Edward E. Kramer, and Martin H. Greenberg, Roc Books, 1995. 
”After You’ve Gone”, in Stranger: Dark Tales of Eerie Encounters, edited by Michelle Slung, Harper Perennial, New York, 2002.  Reprinted in The Best American Mystery Stories 2003, edited by Otto Penzler and Michael Connelly, Houghton Mifflin, Boston, 2003. 
”Serostatus”, in The Magazine of Fantasy & Science Fiction, No. 624, January 2004.
”Let’s Make a Face”, in The Valancourt Book of Horror Stories, Vol. 4, edited by James D. Jenkins & Ryan Cagle, Valancourt Books, 2020. 
”The Man Who Hated Foley”, in The Pulp Horror Book of Phobias, Vol. II, edited by M. J. Sydney, Lycan Valley Press, 2020. 
”The Open House”, in Night Terrors, Vol. 21, Scare Street, 2022. 
”Electric Pink”, in Pink Triangle Rhapsody, Lycan Valley Press, 2022.

Other 
Cooke, John Peyton (1989). The Lake. Avon Books, New York 
Cooke, John Peyton (1991). Out for Blood. Avon Books, New York . 
Cooke, John Peyton (2013). Out for Blood. Reprinted by Éditions Cuir Noir, London. .
Cooke, John Peyton (2019). Out for Blood. Reprinted by Valancourt Books, Richmond, Virginia 
Cooke, John Peyton (1993). Torso. Headline, London. .
Cooke, John Peyton (1994). Torsos. The Mysterious Press/Warner Books, New York. .
Cooke, John Peyton (1994). Torsos. Translated into Spanish by María del Mar Moya. Planeta, Barcelona. .
Cooke, John Peyton (1994). The Chimney Sweeper. Headline, London. .
Cooke, John Peyton (1995). The Chimney Sweeper. The Mysterious Press/Warner Books, New York. .
Cooke, John Peyton (1996). Haven. The Mysterious Press/Warner Books, New York. .
Cooke, John Peyton (2008). The Rape of Ganymede. Éditions Cuir Noir, Toronto. .
Cooke, John Peyton (2008). The Fall of Lucifer. Éditions Cuir Noir, Toronto 
Cooke, John Peyton (2011). After You’ve Gone and Other Outré Tales. Éditions Cuir Noir, London

Personal life 
He was born in Amarillo, Texas, and grew up in Laramie, Wyoming. He has also lived in New York City, Toronto, London, and currently lives in Los Angeles.

References

1967 births
20th-century American novelists
21st-century American novelists
American expatriates in the United Kingdom
American male novelists
American gay writers
American LGBT novelists
LGBT people from Wyoming
LGBT people from Texas
Novelists from Wyoming
Novelists from Texas
Living people